Boda Janardhan is an Indian politician. He was elected to the Andhra Pradesh Legislative Assembly from Chennur in the 1985, 1989, 1994 and 1999 Andhra Pradesh Legislative Assembly election as a member of the Telugu Desam Party.

In June 2019, Reddy along with TRS leader A. P. Jithender Reddy, Chada Suresh Reddy, who were Ministers in Andhra Pradesh and former Congress MLC, P. Sudhakar Reddy joined the Bharatiya Janata Party.

References

Living people
1958 births
Andhra Pradesh MLAs 1985–1989
Andhra Pradesh MLAs 1989–1994
Andhra Pradesh MLAs 1994–1999
Andhra Pradesh MLAs 1999–2004
Telugu Desam Party politicians
Bharatiya Janata Party politicians from Telangana